KYLA is a non-commercial FM radio station that is licensed to Fountain Valley and serves Orange County on the 92.7 MHz frequency.

KYRA is a non-commercial FM radio station that is licensed to Thousand Oaks, California and  serves Ventura County and far northwestern Los Angeles County on the 92.7 MHz frequency. The station is also heard on FM translator K220FR (91.9 FM) in Thousand Oaks, California.

KYZA is a non-commercial FM radio station that is licensed to Adelanto, California and serves the Victor Valley area on the 92.7 MHz frequency.

Together, the three stations constitute a trimulcast of rimshot signals that covers the Greater Los Angeles area with a city-grade signal; this is accomplished by transmitting from outlying areas of the Los Angeles metropolitan region. All stations are owned by Educational Media Foundation and broadcast the nationally syndicated Christian worship music network Air1.

History

KYRA
KYRA signed on in 1963 with the call letters KNJO, broadcasting from a studio in the Park Oaks shopping center in Thousand Oaks. KNJO stood for "Conejo", the valley in which the station was located. The station's claim to fame at the time was that it was the first FM radio station on the West Coast to broadcast in stereo. KNJO was a community-oriented radio station featuring local news, sports, and remote broadcasts from a variety of local events. The station was built by radio personality Sy Blonder and co-owned by Dodger baseball star Sandy Koufax.

Over the next several decades, KNJO changed hands several times. First, it was purchased by Alan Fischler, Ed Feldman and Art Hogan; later, by Ira Barmack, operator of comedy station KMDY in Thousand Oaks; then by political strategist/attorney Darry Srago; and, finally, by Amaturo Group. The station's studio moved to the North Ranch Mall in Westlake Village before settling in its final location on Long Court in Thousand Oaks. Joseph Amaturo and the Amaturo family purchased the station in 1995 for $2 million and also purchased stations on the same 92.7 FM frequency on Catalina Island and in Temecula. Eventually, they began a trimulcast, and Amaturo changed the call letters of KNJO to KMLT when the station became soft adult contemporary-formatted "Lite 92.7". The goal of the Amaturos was to cover all of Los Angeles and Orange counties with three stations on one frequency, 92.7 FM. During the early 2000s, the Lite 92.7 trimulcast aired the nationally syndicated request-and-dedication program Delilah. Following the trimulcast's subsequent relaunches, the station became KHJL (Jill FM) in 2007 and KLSI (Playlist 92.7) in 2012.

In 2005, KMLT added a 38-watt booster, KMLT-FM1, on Castro Peak near Malibu, California; its city of license is Malibu Vista.

KYLA
KYLA signed on in 1993 with the call letters KRCI and originally broadcast from Catalina Island at 3,000 watts. Later the station began a simulcast with KMLT, changing call signs to KLIT. Initially, the simulcast aired a beautiful music format that evolved to a soft AC music format branded as "Lite 92.7". KLIT was later purchased by Amaturo Group, which created a trimulcast with KELT.

KLIT was moved to Fountain Valley, California with a change of transmitter location, broadcasting from a mountain southeast of Newport Beach, California at 690 watts. This provided a better signal coverage of the interior portions of Orange County, California. The call letters were changed to KJLL-FM (Jill FM) in early 2007 and to KLST-FM (Playlist 92.7) in 2012.

KYZA
KYZA signed on in 1959 with the call letters KACE-FM, originally broadcasting from Riverside, California at 1,000 watts. The station changed its call letters KCNW in 1974, then to KHNY-FM two years later.

The station adopted numerous music formats until 1997, when the call sign was changed to KELT and a trimulcast with KMLT/KLIT was created airing the beautiful music format. The station later switched to soft AC and adopted the branding "Lite 92.7". The station later became KAJL (Jill FM) in 2007 and KLSN in 2012.

92.7 Jill FM and Playlist 92.7
The trimulcast's coverage area was shifted after the moves of all three transmitters, and with the arrival of Jack FM on KCBS-FM (93.1 FM) in 2005, Amaturo Group moved to compete. The company dismissed the airstaff of the "Lite 92.7" stations and adopted an automated adult hits music format branded as "Jill FM". The new format was geared to be a more female-friendly sound, known as Jill, as opposed to the more male-oriented format on Jack FM. In 2009, Jill FM adjusted its format to soft adult contemporary music with the same focus as rival KOST (103.5 FM).

On February 14, 2011, the stations dropped the "Jill FM" name and rebranded as "Playlist 92.7", a classic hits outlet with the slogan "We play everything". The first song played on Playlist was  "Somebody" by Bryan Adams. The new format featured hit songs spanning the period from 1964 to 2010, consisting of a mix of top 40, R&B, adult contemporary and alternative rock.

Air1
On December 1, 2012 at midnight, KLST/KLSN/KLSI (the call signs changed shortly after) officially flipped from AC to the nationally syndicated Christian contemporary hit radio (Christian CHR) network Air1 under new owner Educational Media Foundation. This transaction brought the Christian CHR format to suburban areas of Los Angeles with the station's multiple rimshot Class A signals. At the time of the flip, Air1 played music from a wide variety of contemporary Christian artists such as Tauren Wells, TobyMac, Group 1 Crew, Seventh Day Slumber, and Skillet. The feed is also heard on KTLW's network of Class A FM translators in portions of the northern Los Angeles area as well as on a 92.7 FM repeater in southwestern parts of the metro.

The Air1 network flipped to contemporary worship music on January 1, 2019.

Repeaters

Translators

References

External links

Fountain Valley, California
Radio stations established in 1994
1994 establishments in California
YLA
Air1 radio stations
Educational Media Foundation radio stations